First Presbyterian Church is a historic Presbyterian church located at 2nd Street and 3rd Avenue NW in Hickory, Catawba County, North Carolina.  It was built in 1905–1906, and is a Romanesque Revival-style church sheathed in granite. The front facade features square towers of unequal height.  Attached to the church in 1928, is a three-story granite block Education Building with a flat roof and crenelated cornice.  Also on the property is the former manse; a two-story, American Foursquare dwelling with a low hipped roof, overhanging eaves, and hipped dormer.

It was added to the National Register of Historic Places in 1985.

References

Presbyterian churches in North Carolina
Churches on the National Register of Historic Places in North Carolina
Romanesque Revival church buildings in North Carolina
Churches completed in 1906
20th-century Presbyterian church buildings in the United States
Churches in Catawba County, North Carolina
National Register of Historic Places in Catawba County, North Carolina
1906 establishments in North Carolina